Victor Contador (born 26 April 1948) is a Chilean equestrian. He competed in two events at the 1984 Summer Olympics.

References

External links
 

1948 births
Living people
Chilean male equestrians
Olympic equestrians of Chile
Equestrians at the 1984 Summer Olympics
Place of birth missing (living people)
20th-century Chilean people